The Puerto de las Palomas is a road through two mountains inside the Sierra de Grazalema Natural Park, connecting Grazalema and Zahara de la Sierra villages.

There are great views from it, and there's a nice hiking path to see the northern part of provinces of Cadiz and Málaga as well as the southern part of the Seville one.

There is another Puerto de las Palomas in Andalusia located further northeast in the Sierra de Cazorla/Sierra del Segura area.

Access from Zahara de la Sierra is performed by a road very winding and steep slopes.

See also 

 Puerto del Boyar

References

Geography of the Province of Cádiz
Roads in Spain